Cham Karim (also Romanized as Cham Karīm and Cham-e Karīm; also known as Chamkārī) is a village in Itivand-e Jonubi Rural District, Kakavand District, Delfan County, Lorestan Province, Iran. At the 2006 census, its population was 139, in 29 families.

References 

Towns and villages in Delfan County